Ivănescu is a Romanian-language surname that may refer to:

 Cezar Ivănescu (1941—2008), Romanian poet, writer and playwright
 Gheorghe Ivănescu (1912—1987), Romanian linguist and philologist
 Mircea Ivănescu (1931—2011), Romanian poet, writer and translator
 Petre Ivănescu (b. 1936), Romanian handball player and coach
 Traian Ivănescu (b. 1933), Romanian football player and coach

See also 
 Ivănești

Romanian-language surnames